Shotgun Wedding is a 2022 American romantic action comedy film directed by Jason Moore and written by Mark Hammer. It stars Jennifer Lopez, Josh Duhamel, Sônia Braga, Jennifer Coolidge, Lenny Kravitz, and Cheech Marin. After being filmed from February to April of 2021 in Boston and the Dominican Republic, Shotgun Wedding was released in Singapore on December 28, 2022, and was released on January 27, 2023, by Amazon Studios via Prime Video.

Plot
Tom, Darcy and their families gather for an ultimate destination wedding on a private island in the Philippines. Just as the couple are away arguing about the wedding, their guests are taken hostage. The pirates demand $45 million dollars from Darcy's wealthy father Robert. He refuses to pay until he is assured that Darcy is alive. 

Darcy and Tom are captured apart from the wedding party, but manage to escape their captors, killing one of the pirates. As they try to evade recapture, Darcy and Tom air their respective doubts about the wedding. Cornered hiding in a vault beneath the manager's office, Tom surrenders to them so Darcy can stay hidden. 

When he rejoins the rest of the wedding party, Tom reveals that Darcy's ex-fiancé Sean had hired the pirates. With his plot exposed, Sean goes to hunt down Darcy, taking Robert's girlfriend Harriet as a hostage. Meanwhile, Darcy joins Tom and the rest at the pool where she and Tom admit that they still want to marry each other. 

The wedding party members realize that Harriet was in on the plot with Sean. Tom asks the two pirates standing guard to let them complete the wedding ceremony, and Robert says that he will release the money if they let them get married. As the guests sing "I'll Be", Tom and Darcy rush the pirates, and Darcy takes a grenade off of one. One pirate surrenders; the other runs off, then begins firing on the venue. Tom's mother Carol grabs a weapon from the ground and returns fire. Darcy throws the grenade in the air so Tom can bat it at the pirate, who is blown up in the explosion (which also sets off the fireworks that had been staged for the wedding celebration). 

As the wedding party goes to safety, Darcy and Tom race to get help, but are confronted on the dock by Sean. Tom fights him, then Tom and Darcy escape in a boat. Harriett tries to stop them in a helicopter. Sean, who had been dragged by a rope with the boat, climbs aboard and fights Tom again while Darcy drives the boat. A parasail is released, taking Tom and Sean into the air. Tom zips down the line to the boat deck. Tom and Darcy cut the line, sending the parasail loose into the helicopter's rotors, which kills both Sean and Harriet. Back on the beach, as authorities take the remaining pirates into custody, Tom and Darcy get married.

Cast

Production

Development
The film was first announced on January 29, 2019, with Ryan Reynolds attached to star, Pitch Perfects Jason Moore directing and Mark Hammer writing the screenplay alongside Liz Meriwether. Todd Lieberman and David Hoberman of Mandeville Films would produce the film alongside Reynolds through his production company Maximum Effort. Lopez, Elaine Goldsmith-Thomas, and Benny Medina joined as producers of the film through Nuyorican Productions in October 2020.

Casting
On October 27, 2020, Jennifer Lopez was cast as the female lead. Armie Hammer replaced Reynolds (who eventually served as executive producer for the film) as the male lead in the film before dropping out in January 2021 in the wake of abuse allegations against him. 

On January 19, 2021, Josh Duhamel entered early negotiations to replace Hammer, with his casting confirmed the following month. Sônia Braga and Jennifer Coolidge were also cast in starring roles. On February 16, 2021, Lenny Kravitz, Cheech Marin, D'Arcy Carden, Selena Tan, Desmin Borges, and Alex Mallari Jr. were cast. On May 7, 2021, Callie Hernandez and Steve Coulter joined the cast of the film.

Filming
Filming was originally planned to commence in the summer of 2019, but was later rescheduled to February 22, 2021, with shooting taking place in Boston and the Dominican Republic. Lopez announced on Instagram that principal photography had officially wrapped on April 22, 2021.

Release
The film was originally scheduled to be released theatrically by Lionsgate on June 29, 2022. In March 2022, Amazon Studios acquired the rights to the film for a streaming release on Prime Video, released on January 26, 2023. Lionsgate retained international theatrical rights for the film due to US regulations on theatrical policy. It was released in Singapore (via Encore Films), and was released on the streaming service on January 27, 2023.

According to Nielsen Media Research, Amazon Prime Video saw the largest monthly usage increase in January, recording a 9.3% uptick in viewing (+0.2 share pts.) that was driven by its original series, Tom Clancy's Jack Ryan, and original movie, Shotgun Wedding.

Reception

References

External links
 

2022 action comedy films
2022 romantic comedy films
2020s comedy thriller films
2020s crime comedy films
2020s adventure comedy films
2020s romantic action films
2020s American films
2020s English-language films
American action comedy films
American romantic comedy films
American romantic action films
Films about dysfunctional families
Films about hostage takings
Films about interracial romance
Films about vacationing
Films about weddings
Films directed by Jason Moore
Films produced by David Hoberman
Films produced by Todd Lieberman
Films scored by Pinar Toprak
Films set in the Philippines
Films shot in Boston
Films shot in the Dominican Republic
Girls with guns films
Lionsgate films
Mandeville Films films
Nuyorican Productions films
Summit Entertainment films
Pirate films